The Young Turks' Crime Against Humanity: The Armenian Genocide and Ethnic Cleansing in the Ottoman Empire is a 2011 book by Taner Akçam, published by Princeton University Press. It discusses the role of the Young Turk movement in the Armenian genocide and other ethnic removals.

The original version of the book is in Turkish. The English version has additional content as well as revisions of the original content. Wolfgang G. Schwanitz wrote in the Jewish Political Studies Review that The Young Turks' Crime Against Humanity unifies the various perspectives of the time period 1913–1918, which the book focuses upon, into one historical narrative. The author states that there was no single decision to eliminate Armenians but instead the momentum to kill them came at multiple stages. Several documents cited by the book had been hitherto unpublished.

It is dedicated to Hrant Dink and to Vahakn Dadrian.

Reception
John Waterbury of Foreign Affairs wrote "the fact that a Turkish historian with access to the Ottoman archives has written this book is of immeasurable significance."

Charles Carter of Origins: Current Events in Historical Perspective, jointly of Ohio State University and Miami University, wrote that the "multi-causal explanation of the genocide is highly convincing".

Journal reviews

References

Further reading
 
 
  - Published online on 6 March 2017.

External links
 The Young Turks' Crime Against Humanity - Princeton University Press
 The Young Turks' Crime Against Humanity - Available at JSTOR
 The Young Turks' Crime Against Humanity - Available at Project MUSE

2011 non-fiction books
Princeton University Press books
History books about the Armenian genocide
History books about ethnic cleansing
21st-century history books